The Hôtel Cote-Blatin is a historic hôtel particulier in Clermont-Ferrand, France. It was built in 1897 for Joseph Cote, a physician. It was designed by architect Émile Camut. It has been listed as an official historic monument since 2010.

References

Houses completed in 1897
1897 establishments in France
Hôtels particuliers in Clermont-Ferrand
Monuments historiques of Puy-de-Dôme